Kursela is a village situated in the bank of Trimohini Sangam, which is the confluence of the river Ganga and Kosi . It is the de facto financial centre of Katihar district. As per the Indian government population census of 2011, Kursela was reported to have  city proper population of 63,928.
Being a major wheat and maize producing village, around 40% of its production is transported to neighbouring districts. Kursela is also famous for its grand Chhath celebration at the bank of river Kosi and Ganga. Kursela consist of majorly 10 villages: Gobrahi Diara, Balthi, Basuhar, Debipur Kathi, Dhobinia Milik Dakhinwari, Gobrahi Diara, Tingharia, Shahpur Dharmi Milik, Muradpur, Madhaili and Jarlahi. 45.99% population of Kursela subdivision is literate, out of which 52.83% males and 38.44% females are literate. There are about 12,533 houses in the sub-district.

Geography
It is located at an elevation of 25 m above MSL. 
Located at the north-east part of Bihar, it is surrounded by river Ganga and Kosi River . Kursela consist of three major region - Ayodhyaganj Bazar (located between Kursela Railway Station and NH 31), Teenghariya (at the bank of Ganga and Kursela Basti (at the bank of Kosi River). The total area of Kursela is 156 km². Population density is 410/km².

Location
Kursela is 4 miles (6 km) north of the Bateshwar hills. National Highway 31 passes through Kursela. It is a station on the Barauni-Katihar section of East central Railway.

Origin of name and Mythological History
Kursela is a variant of Kuru-Shila, which translates as the hilly part of the region which once belonged to the king Kuru, the descendants of whom were called Kauravas and, in the Mahabharata, waged a war with the Pandavas, their cousins.

History
Kursela was a Zamindari under British India.  R. B. Raghubansh Prasad Singh.  He was a great philanthropist, and administrator. The Singhs were the largest land donor in Vinoba Bhave's Bhoodan movement, wherein he donated  of land. He sponsored the opening of two schools and a hospital in Kursela. He also donated many houses and land to the congress party including the "Kala Bhavan" in Purnea. Kursela is famous for it integrity among various religion

References

External links
 About Kursela
 Satellite map of Kursela
Cities and towns in Katihar district